Beautiful World is the fifth album by the Colorado rock band Big Head Todd and the Monsters, released in 1997. The album produced two hit singles: "Resignation Superman" and a cover of John Lee Hooker's "Boom Boom".

Critical reception
AllMusic wrote that "the Monsters jam with an expert grace throughout the record, particularly with guests John Lee Hooker and Bernie Worrell, and producer Jerry Harrison helps keep things focused."

Track listing
Track 11 written by John Lee Hooker; all other songs written by Todd Park Mohr

Personnel
 Todd Park Mohr – vocals, guitar, keyboards, saxophone, harmonica
 Brian Nevin – drums, percussion, vocals
 Rob Squires – bass guitar, vocals
 Jeremy Lawton – keyboards, pedal steel guitar, vocals
 Jerry Harrison – piano, arranger, clavinet, producer
 Corey Mauser – organ, piano, clavinet
 Hazel Miller – vocals, backing vocals
 Arlene Newson – backing vocals
 Susan Voelz – violin
 Bernie Worrell – organ, clavinet

Technical personnel
Matt Byrne – general assistance
Daniel Chase – digital editing
Mike Cresswell – assistant engineer
Karl Derfler – engineer
Larimie Garcia – design
Jack Hersca – mixing assistant
Billy Gibbons – guitar
John Lee Hooker – vocals
Màickey Hoolihan – general assistance
Ted Jensen – mastering
Warren Latimer – assistant engineer
Janet Levinson – art direction, design
Tom Lord-Alge – mixing
Kent Matcke – assistant engineer
Matt Need – general assistance
Michael Perfitt – assistant engineer
Andy Torri – pre-production, general assistance

References

1997 albums
Big Head Todd and the Monsters albums
Albums produced by Jerry Harrison
Giant Records (Warner) albums